Shashank Koirala (born 24 October 1958) is a Nepalese politician and Member of House of Representatives, belonging to the political dynasty of Koirala family. Shashanka is also a renowned ophthalmologist.

Political career 
He was the General Secretary of Nepali Congress, being elected in the party's 2016 general convention with 1417 votes against 1017 votes secured by nearest rival Arjun Narasingha K.C.

In the 2008 Constituent Assembly election, he was elected from the Nawalparasi-1 constituency, winning 17430 votes. He was the sole member of the Koirala family to get elected through the First Past the Post system.

He retained his seat in the 2013 Constituent Assembly election as well as in the 2017 Nepalese legislative elections.

Electoral history

2017 legislative elections

Family
He is the third son of former Nepalese Prime Minister B.P. Koirala.

Research 
1.      Thesis: Lipoprotein Profile in Hypertensive Retinopathy - 1985

2.      Investigator: Epidemiology and Microbiology of Corneal Suppuration in

3.      Investigator: Corneal Surface Injury and Role of Early Prophylactic Antibiotic Therapy. (Editor (1994).

4.      Principal Investigator: Efficacy of Antibiotic Prophylaxis for Ocular Surface Trauma Instituted Through Existing Primary Units of Health Care System of - 1996.

5.      Principal Investigator: South Asian Cataract Management Study 1997.

6.      Examiner: Fellow of Royal  and Surgeon, Pakistan

Publication 
1.      Effect of applying intraocular pressure reducer before cataract surgery: M.P. Upadhyay, P.C. Karmacharya, S. R. Shrestha, S. Koirala, J. Inst. Med., P. 277-282, 1986.

2.      Von 's disease (Neurofibromatosis): Case report: P.C. Karmacharya, S. Koirala, M.P. Upadhyay J. Inst. Med. P. 113

3.      Xeroderma pigmentosa: Report of Case P.C. Karmacharya, S. Koirala, M.P. Upadhyay, J. Inst. Med. P 321-326, 1987.

4.      Microbial flora of conjunctiva of live newborn Nepalese Baby: P.C. Karmacharya, M.P Upadhyay, B.M. Pokhrel, S.R. Rai, Nepas Journal, 1988, 7, 63-69 (1988).

5.      Epidemiologic Characteristics, Predisposing Factors, and Etiologic Diagnosis of Corneal Ulceration in Nepal M.P. Upadhyay, P.C. Karmacharya, S. Koirala, N.R. Tuladhar, L.E. Bryan, G. Smolin, J.P. Whithcer: American Journal of Ophthalmology 111:92-99, January 1991.

6.      Vogt Koyanagi Harada (VKS) Syndrome: Case Report D.N. Shah, P.C. Karmacharya, S. Koirala and M.P. Upadhyay, JNMA, Vol. 30, No. 102, Apr-Jan 1992 p 120-124 (J. Nep. Med Assoc. 1992; 30:120-124).

7.      Knowledge Attitude and Practice (KAP) Towards Eye disease: Finding of a Survey in Rural Bhaktapur. Paudyal G. Shah D.N., Koirala S. and Upadhyay M.P. Journal of Institute of Medicine, Kathmandu, 14:277, 1992.

8. Knowledge Attitude and Practice (KAP) of Ophthalmology: Finding of Survey of Primary Health Care workers.

9.      The South Asian Cataract Management Study - The first 662 cataract surgeries: a preliminary report. Snellingen T., S. Gupta, F Huq, J.K. Shrestha, R. Husain, S. Koirala, G.N. Rao et al. British Journal of   Ophthalmology, November 1995, Vol. 79, No. 11, p 1020-1035.

10.  Retinal diseases at TU Teaching Hospital. J.K. Shrestha, S. Koirala, OK Malla, S. Miller. Journal of the  1997, 19:13-17.

11. Burden of ocular trauma in : E. Pradhan, S. Shakya, S. Koirala, M.P. Upadhyay, PCD Karmacharya.

12. B.P. Nepal, S. Adhikary, A.K. Sharma. British Journal of Ophthalmology 2003; 87:531-534.

13. A hospital-based retrospective study. S. Shakya, S. Koirala, PCD Karmacharya. POacific Journal of Ophthalmology Vol. 16, No. 1, Jan, 2004; p 13-16.

References

Living people
Nepalese ophthalmologists
Nepali Congress politicians from Gandaki Province
S
1958 births
Nepal MPs 2017–2022
Children of prime ministers of Nepal
Members of the 1st Nepalese Constituent Assembly
Members of the 2nd Nepalese Constituent Assembly
Nepal MPs 2022–present